Jung Gil-Ok (born 15 September 1980) is a South Korean foil fencer.

Jung won the bronze medal in the foil team event at the 2006 World Fencing Championships after beating Poland in the bronze medal match. She accomplished this with her teammates Jeon Hee-Sok, Seo Mi-Jung and Nam Hyun-Hee.  She also competed in the 2008 Beijing Olympic Games, finishing in 24th position.  She was part of the South Korean team that won the bronze in the women's team foil at the 2012 London Olympics, beating the French team in the bronze medal match.

Achievements
 2006 World Fencing Championships, team foil

External links

References

1980 births
Living people
People from Chuncheon
South Korean female foil fencers
Olympic fencers of South Korea
Fencers at the 2008 Summer Olympics
Fencers at the 2012 Summer Olympics
Olympic bronze medalists for South Korea
Olympic medalists in fencing
Place of birth missing (living people)
Medalists at the 2012 Summer Olympics
Asian Games medalists in fencing
Fencers at the 2006 Asian Games
Asian Games gold medalists for South Korea
Medalists at the 2006 Asian Games
Universiade medalists in fencing
Universiade bronze medalists for South Korea
Medalists at the 2003 Summer Universiade